Hacımustafalı is a village in the municipality of Cəfərli in the Imishli Rayon of Azerbaijan.

References

Populated places in Imishli District